The Unspeakable Act is a 2012 American coming-of-age drama film written and directed by Dan Sallitt. It stars Tallie Medel as Jackie Kimball and Sky Hirschkron as Matthew Kimball, with Aundrea Fares, Kati Schwartz, and Caroline Luft in supporting roles. Framed by her voice-over narrative, the plot focuses on Jackie's unrequited romantic love for her brother Matthew.

The film premiered at the 2012 Sarasota Film Festival, where it won the Independent Visions Award. It received a one-week theatrical run at Anthology Film Archives in New York City on March 1, 2013, and was released on DVD and digital media by Cinema Guild on August 20, 2013. It was also screened at the 2012 Edinburgh International Film Festival, where it was nominated for the Best International Feature Film award, and in the 2013 International Film Festival Rotterdam. The film is dedicated to the late French auteur Éric Rohmer.

Plot
17-year-old Brooklyn high schooler Jackie Kimball lives with her widowed mother, her 18-year-old brother Matthew, and her older sister Jeanne, while her oldest brother is abroad on a student exchange program. Jackie and Matthew have always been extremely close, but their relationship is complicated by her lifelong romantic feelings for him and his lack of reciprocity. Having until now been content with the existing state of affairs, Jackie has no choice but to deal with the disruption of her idyllic childhood world by the harbingers of adulthood.

In the spring of 2011, Matthew gets his first girlfriend, Yolanda. When Yolanda visits the Kimballs, Jackie is surprisingly sociable during the dinner, but unbeknownst to the diners, she is unable to eat without vomiting. Later that evening, Jackie confronts Matthew in the attic room that is their traditional meeting place, but he protests that he "want[s] to give [Yolanda] a chance."

Jackie is notified by a friend through a text message that Matthew unexpectedly broke up with Yolanda. Relieved, Jackie is finally able to enjoy food. Matthew had bought tickets to a concert he was planning to go to with Yolanda but, having broken up with her, invites Jackie instead. She is watchful of any sign that he might become receptive to her overtures, and they discuss her incestuous desire relaxedly, apparently not for the first time. Brother and sister spend a pleasant summer together, capped by an idyllic evening out at the concert.

Jackie's temporary reprieve from her grief wanes along with the summer itself as Matthew's departure for college approaches. Despite keeping up contact via video letters and a host of electronic media, she takes the separation hard, and her concerned mother sends her to psychotherapy. Initially secretive, on one of the visits Jackie finally opens up to her therapist Linda about her attraction to Matthew. Also, with a handsome classmate named Tristan, Jackie has her first sexual experience, of which she does not delay to notify Matthew, and he congratulates her on it.

Having no emotional attachment to Tristan, Jackie does not hesitate to alienate him when Matthew returns on vacation. During a late-night one-on-one chat in the attic room, Matthew, initially unswayed by Jackie's overtly sexual questions, snaps and accuses her of going too far. As he is again leaving for college, she is resigned to the fact that he will never reciprocate her feelings. Under Linda's influence, Jackie eventually makes the tough choice of applying to a different college than Matthew. She decides to major in psychology, an interest ignited by her own life experience.

Cast

Reception
The film received positive reviews. Review aggregator Rotten Tomatoes gives the film a rating of 88% based on reviews from 8 critics. Metacritic gives it a score of  76/100 based on reviews from 5 critics.

Neil Young reviewing the film for The Hollywood Reporter writes "Sensitive subject-matter is handled with tact and intelligence in this tart if talky US indie." According to Dennis Schwartz, "An American indie with European sensibilities, it makes for a different sort of coming of age film – a highbrow and distinctive one that's worth checking out."

Nicolas Rapold of The New York Times wrote, "More often than not the emotional bind is not shocking or taboo at its root, and indeed Mr. Sallitt’s latest, the Brooklyn-set feature The Unspeakable Act, is about the familiar more than it is about the forbidden." Similarly, Drew Hunt of the Chicago Reader warns, "This may bore or frustrate some viewers: the appeal of an incest story is the prospect of seeing repressed, taboo desires erupt into explicit sex and ensuing scandal. In The Unspeakable Act, the heart of the drama is not the transgression but the curious lack thereof."

Film critic Jonathan Rosenbaum included the film on his list of the ten best films of 2013. He later included the film in an afterword to his book Essential Cinema: On the Necessity of Film Canons.

Dan Sallitt, the director and screenwriter of the film himself, said in an interview with Filmmaker, "I personally don’t see Jackie’s incestuous desire as a transitory thing or part of her passage to adulthood. I think it’s just the way she is, and she will have to keep a lid on that desire in order to live comfortably, will have to cultivate other aspects of herself. By film’s end, I’m hoping that the viewer feels that we are all like Jackie, each with some quirk that makes us feel that we are the only abnormal person pretending to fit into an otherwise normal world."

References

External links
 
 

2012 films
2012 independent films
2012 romantic drama films
2010s coming-of-age drama films
2010s English-language films
2010s psychological drama films
2010s teen drama films
2010s teen romance films
American coming-of-age drama films
American independent films
American psychological drama films
American romantic drama films
American teen drama films
American teen romance films
Coming-of-age romance films
Films about siblings
Films set in 2011
Films set in 2012
Films set in Brooklyn
Films set in Manhattan
Films shot in New York City
Incest in film
2010s American films